Te Paparahi o Te Raki (Wai 1040) is a significant claim brought before New Zealand's Waitangi Tribunal by the hapu of Ngāpuhi.

Stage one of the inquiry, which began in May 2010 and concluded with closing submissions in February 2011, resulted in a report in 2014 which found Ngāpuhi never ceded their sovereignty when they signed the Treaty of Waitangi.

While stage two of the inquiry, which began in March 2013, has involved weeks of hearings inquiring into the around 420 Treaty claims brought by hapu from Ngāpuhi, Ngati Wai, Ngati Hine, Patuharakeke, Ngati Rehua, Ngati Whatua and Ngati Manuhiri.

Claim 

The Waitangi Tribunal, in Te Paparahi o te Raki inquiry (Wai 1040) is in the process of considering the Māori and Crown understandings of He Whakaputanga o te Rangatiratanga / The Declaration of Independence 1835 and Te Tiriti o Waitangi / the Treaty of Waitangi 1840. This aspect of the inquiry raises issues as to the nature of sovereignty and whether the Māori signatories to the Treaty of Waitangi intended to transfer sovereignty.

The first stage of the report was released in November 2014, and found that hapu chiefs in Northland never agreed to give up their sovereignty when they signed the Treaty of Waitangi in 1840. Although the Crown intended to negotiate the transfer of sovereignty through the Treaty, the chiefs' understanding of the agreement was they were only ceding the power for the Crown to control Pākehā and protect Māori.

Decision 
Tribunal manager Julie Tangaere said at the report's release to the Ngāpuhi claimants:
Your tupuna [ancestors] did not give away their mana at Waitangi, at Waimate, at Mangungu. They did not cede their sovereignty. This is the truth you have been waiting a long time to hear.

In terms of mana motuhake He Whakaputanga, creating a Māori state and government in 1835 and/or Te Tiriti o Waitangi, and those who did not sign anything, thus maintaining mana motuhake. In relation to the former, a summary report (entitled ‘Ngāpuhi Speaks’) of evidence presented to the Waitangi Tribunal conclusively demonstrates that:

 Ngāpuhi did not cede their sovereignty.
 The Crown had recognised He Whakaputanga as a proclamation by the rangatira of their sovereignty over this country.
 The treaty entered into by the rangatira and the Crown — Te Tiriti o Waitangi — followed on from He Whakaputanga, establishing the role of the British Crown with respect to Pākehā.
 The treaty delegated to Queen Victoria’s governor the authority to exercise control over hitherto lawless Pākehā people in areas of hapū land allocated to the Queen.
 The Crown’s English language document, referred to as the Treaty of Waitangi, was neither seen nor agreed to by Ngāpuhi and instead reflects the hidden wishes of British imperial power.

The report drew together existing scholarship on the Declaration of Independence and the treaty, with the tribunal noting its report represented continuity rather than dramatic change in current treaty scholarship. The Tribunal asserted that, "Though Britain went into the Treaty negotiation intending to acquire sovereignty, and therefore the power to make and enforce law over both Maori and Pakeha, it did not explain this to the rangatira,"

Reaction 
Te Tai Tokerau MP Kelvin Davis said there was a massive cheer at the presentation of the report in Waitangi, when the finding that rangatira who signed the treaty had not ceded sovereignty was read out.The big thing for Ngāpuhi is that it affirms what Ngāpuhi always said, that when we signed the treaty we didn't cede sovereignty. It's correcting the historical narrative that's gone on since 1840.He called for calm and said it was time for "wise heads" to sit down and have a conversation about what the report meant for the country in 2014. It was not clear what the longer term ramifications would be.

Professor Khyla Russell said the ruling was, a pivotal turning point" and a victory for iwi. It does rewrite history in a way Maori have been arguing since 1849 when the claim started. But that land is gone now, only a shadow remains." Russell believed the rangatira would not have signed the Treaty if the word for sovereignty had been used. Words to express that did exist in the Maori language, It's a personal opinion, but I'll always wonder why those words weren't used. They [the rangatira] signed what was in front of them. At last, someone has taken a claim over the wording and the Tribunal has made a ruling, a very brave ruling.In a brief statement responding to the report, Attorney-General and Treaty of Waitangi Negotiations Minister Chris Finlayson said: "There is no question that the Crown has sovereignty in New Zealand. This report doesn't change that fact."

Non-signatory iwi and hapu 
Ngati Tuwharetoa academic Hemopereki Simon outlined a case in 2017, using Ngati Tuwharetoa as a case study, for how hapu and iwi that did not sign the Treaty of Waitangi still maintain mana motuhake and how the sovereignty of the Crown could be considered questionable. This work was builds on the Te Paparahi o te Raki inquiry(Wai 1040) decision by the Waitangi Tribunal.

References

Ngāpuhi
New Zealand case law
Treaty of Waitangi